The House of Jörger von Tollet (also: Jörger, Jörger zu Tollet) is an old and influential noble family from Upper Austria that first appeared in the 13th century.

Literature 
 
 
 Heinrich Wurm: Die Jörger von Tollet. Linz 1955.
 
 Irene und Christian Keller: Die Jörger von Tollet und ihre Zeit. Begleitkatalog zur Sonderausstellung "Standpunkte" im Schloss Tollet. Ried 2010.
 Norbert Loidol: Renaissance in Oberösterreich. Weitra 2010
 Karl Vocelka, Rudolf Leeb, Andrea Scheichl (Hrsg.): Renaissance und Reformation. Katalog zur OÖ. Landesausstellung 2010.

External links 

 

Austrian noble families
Political families of Austria